My Immortal is a Harry Potter-based fan fiction serially published on FanFiction.net between 2006 and 2007. Though notable for its convoluted narrative and constant digressions, the story largely centers on a non-canonical female vampire character named "Ebony Dark'ness Dementia Raven Way" and her relationships with the characters of the Harry Potter series, particularly her romantic relationship with Draco Malfoy, culminating in her travelling back in time to defeat the main antagonist of the series, Lord Voldemort.

My Immortal is popularly regarded as one of the worst works of fan fiction ever written. Since the work's publication, it has gained infamy for its constant grammar and spelling errors, plot inconsistencies and complete disregard for the original Harry Potter source material. Despite this, the series has also inspired multiple derivative works, including a YouTube web series, and is viewed with nostalgia for adolescent fan life.

The author's identity has never been confirmed and has been deemed "unsolvable". The author originally published the story under the username "XXXbloodyrists666XXX" and gave their name as "Tara Gilesbie". In September 2017, someone claiming to be the author updated a FictionPress account stating that she had created an active Tumblr account under her real name; an effort to locate this Tumblr account resulted in the account of young adult novelist Rose Christo. She has since stated that she was one of two co-authors of My Immortal and had provided evidence of her authorship to Macmillan Publishers, but controversy that same month over factual errors in her then-forthcoming memoirs has led to doubt as to her authorship.

The story has been speculated to be a hoax designed to fool and troll readers or to satirize fan fiction, but others consider the work and the alleged online presence of the author too elaborate to fake effectively. In September 2017, Christo stated that My Immortal is a work of satire, though her authorship is disputed.

Plot summary
The protagonist of the story is Ebony Dark'ness Dementia Raven Way, a seventeen-year-old vampire who attends Hogwarts (located in England instead of the original books' Scotland) as a member of Slytherin House. Hogwarts is depicted as being divided between two cliques, the "goffs" and the preps. Ebony and all the sympathetic characters are part of the goth clique while the members of the prep clique are portrayed unsympathetically. Many of the main characters of Harry Potter are given  makeovers which are so extensive that they bear little similarity to their original characterization. Harry, for example, has transfigured his iconic lightning bolt scar into a pentagram, moved to the Slytherin House, and now goes by the name "Vampire" because he "love[s] the taste of human blood". Similarly, Hermione Granger has changed her name to "B'loody Mary Smith" and lives as a goth vampire Satanist in Slytherin as well. It appears that Ebony and her classmates are depicted as attending Hogwarts in the mid-2000s, instead of the 1990s when the Harry Potter series is canonically set. This can be judged by the repeated references to scene and emo culture, which were experiencing a sharp rise in popularity at the time.

The story begins by focusing on Ebony entering a relationship with Draco Malfoy, who is depicted as shy, sensitive and, bisexual. Draco invites Ebony to a Good Charlotte concert in Hogsmeade. She agrees, and the two fly to Hogsmeade together in Draco's black flying Mercedes-Benz. After the concert, they do not return to the castle. The two instead have intercourse in the Forbidden Forest. In a subsequent author's note, it is explained this outburst occurred because Dumbledore was suffering from a headache.

Later, Ebony confronts Harry "Vampire" Potter in front of Severus Snape's class (variously called "Snap", "Snope", "Snoop", or "Snipe") as well as an entirely-naked Draco. She learns that Draco used to date Vampire. Ebony becomes so angry at this perceived betrayal, despite identifying as bisexual herself and professing a sexual attraction to 'sensitive bi guyz', that she runs crying into the Forbidden Forest, where she is approached by Lord Voldemort. Voldemort, speaking in faux-archaic English for reasons left unexplained, gives her a gun and demands that she kill Vampire. Voldemort threatens her, saying that he will kill Draco unless she kills Vampire, but she refuses. When Draco later learns of this encounter, he is so angry that Ebony kept it from him that he kills himself by slitting his wrists.

In a subsequent scene, however, Vampire has a vision of Draco being held prisoner by Voldemort. After rescuing Draco from Voldemort, Ebony and her friends attend a My Chemical Romance concert in Hogsmeade. After some songs have been played, the concert ends abruptly when the members of My Chemical Romance reveal themselves to be Voldemort and his Death Dealers. Voldemort, who had been disguised as lead vocalist Gerard Way, proclaims his intent to kill Ebony and Draco for the former's failure to kill Vampire, but they are saved by Dumbledore, who had just given himself a gothic makeover. The next day, Dumbledore gives a gothic makeover to the Hogwarts Great Hall as well, but Ebony feels that he is a poser and dislikes him greatly, a sentiment shared by her friends.

During this time, "Lucian Malfoy" and "Serious Blak" are inexplicably shot by a gun-toting "black guy" (likely meant to be Blade given the vampire themes). There is also a secondary plot point in which Professor Trelawney ("Trevolry") / Professor Sinistra ("Sinister", "Sinatra"), combined into one character, has an addiction to what is presumably the truth serum Veritaserum – named Voldemortserum in the story. A third plot point sees Professor McGonagall (often referred to as "McGoogle" or "McGoggles") and Snape attempting to rape or harm the protagonists. Yet another plot point follows Remus Lupin and Snape being bisexuals who spy on Ebony, at one point resulting in a moment shortly after Draco's "death" where they are sitting on their broomsticks with "Loopin " to Ebony bathing, to which she responds with shooting them "a gazillion times" with a gun Draco had gifted to her off-page. In another instance, they have sex in the Great Hall with Dobby watching. In addition, Hagrid is inexplicably a teenage Hogwarts student who has a crush on Ebony, his bandmate in their gothic metal band Bloody Gothic Rose 666, and who is also a Satanist.

Ebony begins having mysterious visions, about which she confronts "Professor Sinister". After gazing into a black crystal ball, she is told she must travel back in "tim" (using a pensieve) to stop Tom Riddle from becoming Voldemort by seducing him, and to retrieve a cure for Sinister/Trevolry's addiction. Arriving in the past, she meets the young Riddle, who calls himself "Satan", and who has been mistakenly referred to as "Tom Bombodil", "Tom Anderson", and "Stan". Satan is in a band with James Potter, Severus Snape, Sirius Black, and Lucius Malfoy. He is uncanonically depicted attending Hogwarts at the same time as the Marauders in what is further uncanonically portrayed as the 1980s. The author points out a few anachronisms in these scenes, telling readers to ignore them. There is also an unexplained cameo by a gothic Marty McFly, who gives Ebony a black DeLorean time machine able to transform into an iPod, allowing her to travel forward in time.

Eventually, Ebony brings Satan forward in time, where he morphs into the present-day Voldemort. This leads to a confrontation between the forces of good and evil in the Great Hall, in which professor Snape threatens to rape Draco if Ebony does not stab Vampire. The story ends ambiguously with a shootout between Snape and Draco, Snape summoning Voldemort, and Ebony firing off an Avada Kedavra curse, which is misrepresented as "abra kedabra".

Style and genre
My Immortal is split into 44 chapters with author's notes, indicated by "AN", preceding and throughout the narrative prose. These notes are written in a largely phonetic spelling and text speak, characterizing the author as "standoffish" (for example, one author's note says "dey nu eechodder b4" rather than "they knew each other before"). As the work progresses, these author's notes become increasingly "defensive, impenetrable, and prone to mentioning suicide attempts" and defend the work's poor spelling and deviation from canon.

Abraham Riesman of Vulture.com described the prose as having "awkward rhythm, strange digressions, and stultifyingly purple prose" and noted that the work is "agonizing" to a regular fan fiction reader because of "all the hated tropes" it employs in the opening passage alone. Adi Robertson of The Verge observed that the quality of the prose declined after the twelfth chapter, when the work's editor had a falling out with the author and became temporarily uninvolved with the work; even after the editor and author reconciled, Robertson felt that the prose "never recovered". Gavia Baker-Whitelaw of The Daily Dot noted the work "featured all the hallmarks of terrible fanfic: hundreds of grammar and spelling mistakes, a nonsensical storyline, and a Mary Sue protagonist who was clearly a glorified version of the author" and pointed out the numerous descriptions of the protagonist's Hot Topic outfits.

The work is characterized by misspellings permeating both the work itself and the author's notes, to the point that the names of the protagonist and canonical Harry Potter characters are frequently and variously misspelled. A 2011 analysis of the text found that it contains far more spelling mistakes (approximately 5,200) than grammar errors (nearly 700). Although the work does contain many grammar errors, the majority of the sentences are technically well-formed and fairly complex in structure; "This contrast between [the author]'s grammatical talent and lexical disability makes the reader aware that the author is capable of writing well, but unwilling to do so." The spelling mistakes also include "provocative" malapropisms, replacing common words with unrelated and improbably rare vocabulary. For example:

Perdition, here replacing the word prediction, refers to eternal damnation of the soul in Christian theology. This fits in with the story's gothic and sadist themes.

The work notably fails to adhere to Harry Potter canon. It features "an incredibly out-of-character Harry Potter universe" where "at no point do any of the Harry Potter characters act even slightly like themselves". References to "decidedly un-Harry Potterish bands" such as My Chemical Romance have also been noted.

Background and publication
My Immortal was published on FanFiction.net under the username "XXXbloodyrists666XXX", with the author using the name "Tara Gilesbie" throughout the work. Author's notes in the story identified a friend nicknamed Raven, operating under username "bloodytearz666", as the work's editor and beta reader. The work was published between early 2006 and 2007, ultimately totaling 44 chapters and nearly 22,700 words. The forty-fourth chapter was accompanied by an author's note explaining that the author was leaving "", commonly believed to be Dubai (although readers have pointed out that "dubya" could refer to anywhere beginning with the letter W, e.g. "Washington"), and the chapter would be the last until the author's return. However, no further chapters were published. It was removed by site administrators in 2008, a few months after its last chapter was published. The complete text survives in copied-and-pasted versions across the Internet. The work apparently takes its name from the song "My Immortal" by Evanescence.

Chapters 39 and 40, according to the author's notes, were written by a hacker, and the writing in both chapters was a "much more controlled prose that read like a lampoon of the previous 38".

Authorship

2006–2016: Speculation on authorship and genre
The true identity of the author has become subject to wide speculation, and since the publication of the final chapter, various individuals have claimed to have written the work in jest or as a hoax. Due to its "systematically terrible" quality, the work is often believed to be a satire or parody of fan fiction. At the same time, the "exceedingly complicated" details of the work, including a series of related online accounts outside of FanFiction.net and the effort of writing a work of such length, led to a "consensus" among users of Encyclopedia Dramatica — a website dedicated to cataloging "internet culture" — that it would be too difficult to fake and that Gilesbie was writing sincerely, a sentiment apparently shared by other online communities who mocked the author. Brad Kim, editor of Know Your Meme, supported the work as genuine, citing his experiences with writing workshops on LiveJournal and Xanga where he encountered similar works, as "these were the kinds of things that would be formulated by a high school teenager in the early 2000s". Writing for Vulture.com, Abraham Riesman wrote that "[t]he mystery of the authorship of 'My Immortal' — even in this privacy-averse age — appears unsolvable."

A series of videos were uploaded to a YouTube account named "xXblo0dyxkissxX" in 2008 and 2009 in which two teenagers calling themselves Tara and Raven made fun of goth subculture. The overlap with the culture and style of My Immortal have led to speculation that they were the fan fiction's Tara and Raven. They were found and interviewed for the On the Media blog in 2014, but they stated they were not the authors and one stated she did not know about My Immortal until after uploading the videos.

2017: Rose Christo co-authorship claim
Rose Christo, an author of young adult novels, began writing a memoir about her alleged experiences as a Native American child separated from her brother in the New York foster care system. The memoir, entitled Under the Same Stars: The Search for My Brother and the True Story of My Immortal, details the period of time during which she allegedly co-wrote My Immortal. Macmillan Publishers allegedly hired a lawyer to verify Christo's claims over the course of three days; she claimed to have provided proof through the email address with which she created the FanFiction.net account and with a flash drive containing the first eleven unedited chapters of My Immortal.

In March 2017, Christo quietly stated on her Tumblr account that she co-wrote My Immortal; however, the post gained little notice. In early August 2017, Christo posted an update to a previously unknown FictionPress account, seemingly related to Tara Gilesbie, that similarly received little attention.

Later in August, an independently published Handbook for Mortals came to public attention after it was discovered that its sales were artificially inflated to push it to the top of the young adult New York Times Best Seller list, from which it was subsequently removed. Writing similarities between the novel and My Immortal led to speculation that Handbook for Mortals author Lani Sarem was the author of My Immortal. Christo again updated the FictionPress account to say she was not Sarem. She also posted on FictionPress to state that her only social media account was on Tumblr, which operated under her real name. An editorial assistant at Macmillan Publishers also stated that Sarem was not the author of My Immortal and stated that Macmillan was to publish the author's memoir.

These statements sparked a search for the claimed Tumblr account, which was found as Christo's in early September. By September 5, Christo stated on her Tumblr account that she co-wrote My Immortal and that she had provided proof to her publisher Macmillan Publishers, later reported by BuzzFeed, and on September 7, BuzzFeed published her first official statement as the alleged author of My Immortal. She said of her decision to publicly identify herself as a co-author: "I would never have come forward about My Immortal if not for the fact that it coincided with the things that happened to me as a teen."

Later that month, a forum post on Kiwi Farms by Christo's brother (the subject of her memoir), verified as such by the forum operators, refuted many of Christo's claims in the upcoming memoir, including those of their Native American ancestry, shared childhood history, and ever having been in foster care. The memoir was subsequently canceled by Macmillan after an investigation found factual errors in her narrative; Christo claimed that she had made these errors intentionally in an attempt to protect her family's identity, but had done so without the publisher's knowledge. Christo's brother has additionally said that he does not know if Christo wrote My Immortal and that she enjoyed ridiculing badly written fan fiction. Christo confirmed via Tumblr in October that her original name was Theresa Rose Christodoulopoulos, confirmed her brother's identity, and conceded that many of his revelations about her were true, but also disagreed with a few of his claims and reiterated her claim that she was one of the authors of My Immortal. She closed the Tumblr account a few days later. Vox described Christo's authorship claim as one of the more likely claims she has made, though still in some doubt.

Reception and legacy
Before its removal from FanFiction.Net, My Immortal allegedly gained between 8,000 and 10,000 reviews per posted chapter, most of which were negative and contained flaming. The quality of the writing and the author's apparent goth lifestyle also drew attacks and mockery from users on Encyclopedia Dramatica, TV Tropes, LiveJournal, Something Awful, YTMND and YouTube.

Rob Bricken of io9 described the work as a "masterpiece of weirdness" and a "masterpiece of literary disaster". BuzzFeed called My Immortal a "work of comic genius" that is "oddly touching." The work is often cited as the worst fan fiction ever written or at least a "strong contender" for the title. The work is considered "iconic" not only within the Harry Potter fandom but also within the larger fan fiction community. Evanescence singer Amy Lee, one of the writers of the eponymous song "My Immortal", was initially introduced to it through her sister, but avoided reading it until an interview request with The Verge. In the interview, she expressed confusion about the work's veracity, but noted that she was "laughing really, really hard at one point, just because of the nonsense". Michael J. Nelson and Conor Lastowka read the story on their podcast 372 Pages We'll Never Get Back on episodes 78–80, criticizing its bad writing and messy plot.

Scott Alexander argued that the work can serve as a projective test. He provided an example with a tongue-in-cheek argument that it mirrors the typical structures and tropes that medieval alchemists used to encipher their results.

The infamy of the work is considered a "constant millstone around the necks of fanfiction enthusiasts who struggle to bring legitimacy to the genre". Christo claimed in September 2017 that My Immortal is a work of satire, though any evidence of this is tied to her own claims of authorship.

My Immortal inspired further fan works, including fan art and further fan fiction. It was the subject of numerous YouTube dramatic readings intending to mock the work and it later inspired a fifteen-episode web series satirizing the work.

See also
 Hogwarts School of Prayer and Miracles, another nearly universally condemned fan fiction based on Harry Potter
 Harry Potter and the Methods of Rationality, a mostly well-received Harry Potter fan fiction
 The Eye of Argon, a 1970 published novella with a similar reputation
 Poe's law, an online adage stating that it is difficult to distinguish authentic works from satire
 List of fake memoirs and journals

Notes

References

2006 short stories
2007 short stories
Fiction set in the 1980s
Harry Potter controversies
Harry Potter fan fiction
Internet memes
Literature about time travel
Literature first published in serial form
Mental health in fiction
Satanism in popular culture
Fiction about suicide
Unfinished literature 
Vampires in written fiction
Witchcraft in written fiction
Wizards in fiction
Works about depression
Works of uncertain authorship
Works of unknown authorship
Internet mysteries